Alkalicoccus luteus is a Gram-positive bacterium from the genus of Alkalicoccus.

References

Bacillaceae
Bacteria described in 2014